William Carey University is located in  Shillong  in Meghalaya, India. Established by the Gazette of Meghalaya No. 76 William Carey Act 2005, authorising ACTS to establish the William Carey University It is named after the Baptist missionary  William Carey.William Carey University is committed primarily to higher education.

References
University Contact List as per UGC

2005 establishments in Meghalaya
Universities and colleges in Meghalaya
Educational institutions established in 2005
Private universities in India